The white-browed fulvetta (Fulvetta vinipectus) is a bird species in the family Paradoxornithidae. Like the other typical fulvettas, it was long included in the Timaliidae genus Alcippe or in the Sylviidae.

Ranging across the Indian subcontinent and Southeast Asia, it is endemic to Bhutan, India, Myanmar, Nepal and Vietnam. Its natural habitat is temperate forests.

Gallery

References

 BirdLife International 2004.  Alcippe vinipectus.   2006 IUCN Red List of Threatened Species.   Downloaded on 25 July 2007.
Collar, N. J. & Robson, C. 2007. Family Timaliidae (Babblers)  pp. 70 – 291 in; del Hoyo, J., Elliott, A. & Christie, D.A. eds. Handbook of the Birds of the World, Vol. 12. Picathartes to Tits and Chickadees. Lynx Edicions, Barcelona.

white-browed fulvetta
Birds of North India
Birds of Nepal
Birds of Bhutan
Birds of Central China
Birds of Yunnan
white-browed fulvetta
Taxonomy articles created by Polbot